Demidovs is a 1983 Soviet drama film directed by Yaropolk Lapshin.

Plot 
The first series shows the relationship of the Demidovs with Peter the Great. Akinfiy Demidov in a short time was able to establish the production of pig iron and cannons, thanks to which Russia won a number of significant victories. In the second series, Akinfiy becomes the master in the Urals and was able to oppose the ruler Biron, distinguished by cruelty and cunning.

Cast 
 Yevgeniy Yevstigneyev as Nikita Antufiev-Demidov
 Vadim Spiridonov as Akinfiy Demidov
 Aleksandr Lazarev as Petr I
 Leonid Kuravlyov as Menshikov
 Mikhail Kozakov as Biron
 Tatyana Tashkova as Marya
 Lyubov Polekhina as Yevdokiya Korobkova-Demidova
 Lyudmila Chursina as Yekaterina I
 Lidiya Fedoseeva-Shukshina as Anna Ioannovna
 Valeriy Zolotukhin as Panteley

References

External links 
 

1983 films
1980s Russian-language films
Soviet drama films
1983 drama films
Cultural depictions of Peter the Great